João Cravo (born 16 September 1929) is a Portuguese rower. He competed in the men's eight event at the 1952 Summer Olympics.

References

External links

1929 births
Possibly living people
Portuguese male rowers
Olympic rowers of Portugal
Rowers at the 1952 Summer Olympics
Place of birth missing (living people)